Tupý may refer to:
 Karel Eugen Tupý, a Czech poet
 Daniel Tupý, a murdered Slovak university student

See also 
 Related surnames
 Tupy (disambiguation)
 Tuppy

Czech-language surnames
Slovak-language surnames